Bjarki Sigurðsson (born 16 November 1967) is an Icelandic former handball player who competed in the 1988 Summer Olympics. Bjarki is one of the most experienced players in the history of the Iceland men's national handball team. His son is footballer Bjarki Steinn Bjarkason.

References

1967 births
Living people
Bjarki Sigurdsson
Bjarki Sigurdsson
Handball players at the 1988 Summer Olympics